Hofstra University Soccer Stadium, is a 1,600 seat soccer-specific stadium on the campus of Hofstra University in Hempstead, New York.  It is part of the Hofstra University sports complex. First opened in 2003, it is the home field of the Hofstra Pride men's and women's soccer teams. As of 2021, Hofstra University Soccer Stadium is also home to NISA club New Amsterdam FC.

The stadium has hosted the first round of the NCAA Division I Men's Soccer Tournament games in 2005, 2006 and 2015.

See also
James M. Shuart Stadium

References

External links
Hofstra University Soccer Stadium
Hofstra University Soccer Stadium Map

College soccer venues in the United States
Hofstra Pride men's soccer
Hofstra Pride women's soccer
Soccer venues in the New York metropolitan area
Sports venues in Nassau County, New York
2003 establishments in New York (state)
Sports venues completed in 2003
Former National Independent Soccer Association stadiums